Gyo Fujikawa (November 3, 1908 – November 26, 1998) was an American illustrator and children's book writer. A prolific creator of more than 50 books for children, her work is regularly in reprint and has been translated into 17 languages and published in 22 countries. Her most popular books, Babies and Baby Animals, have sold over 1.7 million copies in the U.S. Fujikawa is recognized for being the earliest mainstream illustrator of picture books to include children of many races in her work, before it became common to do so.

Biography 
 Gyo Fujikawa was born in Berkeley, California, to Japanese parents, Hikozō and Yūko Fujikawa (藤川幽子). The masculine name Gyo (pronounced "gyoh") is after a Chinese emperor her father admired.

Gyo Fujikawa moved to Los Angeles to attend Chouinard Art Institute in 1926, having received a scholarship, and befriended Japanese dancer Michio Ito and many fellow Nisei writers and artists. After graduating and spending a year in Japan, she was on the Chouinard faculty from 1933-1937. She worked for the Walt Disney Company in California as a promotional artist, before moving to New York in 1941. Fujikawa avoided the forced internment of West Coast Japanese and Japanese Americans during World War II as she was living in New York at the time. Her family, however, spent the war in the internment camp at Rohwer, Arkansas. From 1943-51 she worked for pharmaceutical advertising agency William Douglas McAdams.

In 1951 Fujikawa became a full-time freelancer, producing more than 80 front-cover illustrations for Children's Digest and other periodicals, and about five years later was approached by juvenile editor Debra Dorfman at Grosset & Dunlap to illustrate Robert Louis Stevenson's "A Child's Garden of Verses". This was her first published children's book, in 1957.  Babies, the first book both written and illustrated by Fujikawa in 1963, was also one of the earliest children's books to use multi-racial characters, a consistent feature across her body of work.

After the success of "A Child's Garden of Verses," Fujikawa became one of the first artists to contract for Royalty payment, refusing to perform work unless her publisher agreed to pay her royalties.

Fujikawa's books have been reprinted for mass-market and published worldwide. Her most popular books, Babies, Baby Animals, A to Z Picture Book and Oh!, What A Busy Day!, unfailingly represent a happy, detailed version of childhood. Her joyous illustrations remain sweet and nostalgic, without ever becoming overly saccharine. Her paintings of children are recognizable for round happy faces, rosy cheeks and simple dot eyes. Discussing her respect for her audience, she said: 
"In illustrating for children, what I relish most is trying to satisfy the constant question in the back of my mind--will this picture capture a child's imagination? What can I do to enhance it further? Does it help to tell a story? I am far from being successful (whatever that means), but I am ever so grateful to small readers who find 'something' in any book of mine."

Fujikawa died on November 26, 1998, in New York Hospital.  Although she had been engaged at the age of 19, she never married.

Other work 
Fujikawa's notable commercial clients included Upjohn Company vitamins, Beech-Nut baby food and Eskimo Pie, creating the round-faced child icon for the ice cream treat. She created six stamps for the United States Post Office, including the 1997 32¢ "yellow rose" self-adhesive stamp and the United States-Japan Treaty ratification centenary stamp of 1960. Fujikawa was a life member of the Society of Illustrators.

In popular culture 
Playwright Lloyd Suh scripted a one-act play imagining a dialogue between Walt Disney and Fujikawa titled Disney and Fujikawa. It was performed at the Ensemble Studio Theatre in New York City in 2017 and was reviewed by the New York Times.

In 2019 Penguin Random House published a book written by Kyo Maclear and illustrated by Julie Morstad about Fujikawa called It Began With a Page. This book was one of New York Public Library’s Best Books for Kids 2019, the Globe and Mail's 100 Books That Shaped 2019, the Chicago Public Library's Chicago Best of the Best Books of 2019 under Best Informational Books for Younger Readers and one of Kirkus Reviews' Best of 2019 Picture Books (Biography). It was also featured on Today's "24 beautiful kids’ books that reflect the Asian American experience.”

Bibliography

Written and illustrated by Gyo Fujikawa 

 Babies, 1963
 Baby Animals, 1963
A to Z Picture Book, 1974
Let's Eat, 1975
Let's Play, 1975
Puppies, Pussycats, and Other Friends, 1975
Sleepy Time, 1975
Oh, What a Busy Day!, 1976
Babies of the Wild, 1977
Betty Bear's Birthday, 1977
Can You Count? New York, 1977
Our Best Friends, 1977
Millie's Secret, 1978
Let's Grow A Garden, 1978
My Favorite Thing, 1978
Surprise! Surprise!, 1978
Come Follow Me to the Secret World of Elves and Fairies and Gnomes and Trolls, 1979
Jenny Learns A Lesson, 1980
Welcome Is a Wonderful Word, 1980
Come Out and Play, 1981
Dreamland, 1981
Fairyland, 1981
Faraway Friends, 1981
The Flyaway Kite, 1981
Good Morning!, 1981
Here I Am, 1981
Jenny and Jupie, 1981
The Magic Show, 1981
Make-Believe, 1981
My Animal Friends, 1981
One, Two, Three, A Counting Book, 1981
Shags Has a Dream, 1981
Mother Goose, 1981
A Tiny Word Book, 1981
Year In, Year Out, 1981
Jenny and Jupie to the Rescue, 1982
Fraidy Cat, 1982
Me Too! New York, 1982
Sam's All-Wrong Day, 1982
Shags Finds a Kitten, 1983
That's Not Fair, 1983
Are You My Friend Today?, 1988
Sunny Books: Four Favorite Tales, 1989
Ten Little Babies, 1989
See What I Can Be!, 1990
Good Night, Sleep Tight, Shh, 1990
Be Careful, Brian and Other Tales, 1996

Illustrated by Gyo Fujikawa 

I Like Automobiles, 1931, by Dorothy Walter Baruch
A Child's Garden of Verses, 1957, by Robert Louis Stevenson
The Night Before Christmas, 1961, by Clement C. Moore
Mother Goose, 1968
A Child's Book of Poems, 1969
Fairy Tales and Fables, 1970 
Poems for Children, 1980
Baby Mother Goose, 1989
Poems for Small Friends, 1989

References 

1908 births
1998 deaths
American children's writers
American illustrators
American writers of Japanese descent
American artists of Japanese descent
American stamp designers
Artists from California
Writers from Berkeley, California
Artists from Berkeley, California
Disney people
20th-century illustrators of fairy tales
American expatriates in Japan
American women writers of Asian descent